Omer Curtis Newsome (May 20, 1900 – September 12, 1933) was an American Negro league pitcher in the 1920s.

A native of Indianapolis, Indiana, Newsome made his Negro leagues debut in 1923 with the Indianapolis ABCs. He went on to play for the Washington Potomacs, Detroit Stars, and Dayton Marcos, and finished his career in 1929 with the Memphis Red Sox. Newsome died in Dayton, Ohio in 1933 at age 33.

References

External links
 and Seamheads

1900 births
1933 deaths
Dayton Marcos players
Detroit Stars players
Indianapolis ABCs players
Memphis Red Sox players
Washington Potomacs players
20th-century African-American sportspeople
Baseball pitchers